Trade unions in Saint Helena emerged in the late 1950s in the flax industry and subsequently played a prominent role in the island's democratisation in the 1960s. The Saint Helena General Workers Union was the island's sole trade union throughout the latter half of the 20th century.  In the 21st century, workers are mostly organised in the public sector in staff associations for nurses, teachers and public servants.

History 
In June 1958 the British Labour Party member of parliament, Cledwyn Hughes, visited the island and later reported to the Colonial Office that workers were living in "appalling poverty."  At a public meeting during the visit, discussion ensued on the need for a trade union.  The Saint Helena General Workers Union was established on 23 July 1958 and on 22 September 1958 a strike launched at the Sandy Bay flax mill.

From 2000 
In 2001, the Saint Helena General Workers Union was estimated to have 700 members.

In 2013, during the construction of the Saint Helena Airport, workers went on strike over employment terms and conditions; it was reported as the first industrial action on the island in half a century.

References 

Economy of Saint Helena
Politics of Saint Helena